All These Lighted Things (three little dances for orchestra) is an orchestral composition by the American composer Elizabeth Ogonek.  The work was commissioned by the Chicago Symphony Orchestra, for which Ogonek co-serves as Mead composer-in-residence with the composer Samuel Adams.  The piece was given its world premiere by the Chicago Symphony Orchestra under the direction of Riccardo Muti on September 28, 2017.

Composition
All These Lighted Things was composed over a period of five months in 2017.  The title of the piece comes from a poem by Thomas Merton.  The work has a duration of approximately 15 minutes and is cast in three short movements:
Exuberant, playful, bright
Gently drifting, hazy
Buoyant

Instrumentation
The work is scored for a large orchestra consisting of two flutes, two piccolos, two oboes, two clarinets and E-flat clarinet, two bassoons, four horns, three trumpets, three trombones, tuba, timpani, percussion, and strings.

Reception
Reviewing the world premiere, the music critic John von Rhein of the Chicago Tribune wrote, "Ogonek works painstakingly at her craft and it shows in the acutely wrought instrumental detail that pervades her 15-minute opus."  He continued, "Dancelike figures drive the first and third dances (Ogonek originally considered writing a set of modern mazurkas out of respect for her Polish heritage), set off by the gently drifting haze of tonal lyricism — Charles Ives without the dissonant harmonic clashes — of the central dance. Her inventive, even jazzy writing for chiming crotales, triangles and tubular bells, over shifting meters, kept percussionist Cynthia Yeh and colleagues happily engaged. It's an attractive piece that went down easily — perhaps too easily — with Thursday's audience."  Hedy Weiss of the Chicago Sun-Times similarly remarked, "It is a new work that deserves many hearings, and one that is sure to offer additional pleasures with each of them."

Despite praising Ogonek's chamber violin concerto In Silence as "a small masterpiece," Lawrence A. Johnson of the Chicago Classical Review was more critical of All These Lighted Things, observing, "Like many young composers with minimal orchestra experience, one gets the sense of Ogonek stitching together offbeat sounds and disparate colors that offer some striking sonic effects yet lack a sense of direction and overall development—even in the brief spans of three short movements."  He added:

References

Compositions by Elizabeth Ogonek
2017 compositions
Compositions for symphony orchestra
Music commissioned by the Chicago Symphony Orchestra